Miguel Laureano Correa (born November 12, 1983) is a Puerto Rican politician affiliated with the New Progressive Party (PNP). He is a member of the Puerto Rico Senate since 2017 representing Humacao Senatorial district.

Early years and studies
Born to Miguel A. Laureano Rivera and María Correa Gómez. Graduated from the Colegio Católico Notre Dame in Caguas, Puerto Rico where he began his studies from the third grade. Attended the University of Puerto Rico where he graduated with two bachelors in Psychology and sociology.

Political career
Presided over the youth of the New Progressive Party in San Lorenzo, Puerto Rico. He led the PNP state Youth, was Secretary general of the PNP Youth and chaired the PNP Youth Regulation Commission.

References

External links
 

Members of the Senate of Puerto Rico
New Progressive Party (Puerto Rico) politicians
University of Puerto Rico alumni
Living people
1983 births